The Shoaib Akhtar Stadium, formerly known as Khan Research Laboratories Ground, is a multi-use stadium in Rawalpindi, Pakistan. At first named after the Pakistan nuclear enrichment facility Khan Research Laboratories, it was renamed Shoaib Akhtar Stadium in honour of the former Pakistani fast bowler in March 2021.

The stadium has a capacity of 8,000 spectators. It is currently used mostly for football matches, on club level by KRL FC of the Pakistan Premier League. It was also used for first-class cricket and List A cricket matches as the home venue for the Khan Research Laboratories cricket team. 
In September 2019, the Pakistan Cricket Board named it as one of the venues to host matches in the 2019–20 Quaid-e-Azam Trophy.

See also
List of cricket grounds in Pakistan

References

Football venues in Pakistan